Dupleix was a  F70 type anti-submarine frigate of the French Navy. She was the fourth French vessel (beside also two French commercial ships) named after the 18th century Governor of Pondichéry and Governor-General of the French possessions in India marquess Joseph François Dupleix. She was decommissioned in 2014.

Service history
Dupleix was constructed by the Brest Arsenal, France, with her keel being laid down on 17 October 1975. The vessel was launched on 2 December 1978 and was commissioned into the French Navy on 13 June 1981. The vessel was named for Joseph François Dupleix, the 18th century Governor of Pondichéry and Governor-General of the French possessions in India. The ship was decommissioned in 2014, and taken to Saint-Mandrier, to replace the ex-Rance at the diving school located there.

Citations

Georges Leygues-class frigates
Frigates of France
Cold War frigates of France
1978 ships
Ships built in France